Bull & the Matadors were an American funk group from East St Louis, Illinois. They had a hit single in 1968 with the tune "The Funky Judge", released on Toddlin' Town Records. The record peaked at #39 on the Billboard Hot 100 and #9 on the US Billboard R&B chart. They released two further singles, "Move With the Groove" and "You Decide/Love Come Down", but neither cracked the charts, and the group was not heard from again.

Members
James Lafayette "Bull" Parks
Milton Hardy
James Otis Love
Robert Holmes

References

Musical groups from Chicago